Get Ready (stylized as Get Ready♡) is the second studio album released by Japanese singer-songwriter Tomomi Itano. It was released in Japan on King Records on November 2, 2016.

It was released in three versions: a limited CD+DVD edition (Type-A), a limited CD+photobook edition (Type-B), and a regular CD edition.

It included title tracks from all six of Tomomi Itano's CD singles (from the sixth single "Come Party!" to the eighth single "Hide & Seek") and four new songs.

Track listing 

Notes
 Source:
 Limited edition Type B includes a photo book.

Charts

Weekly charts

Daily charts

Sales 
Total reported sales: 9,502

References 

King Records (Japan) albums
2016 albums
Japanese-language albums
Tomomi Itano albums